Christian Identity (also known as Identity Christianity) is an interpretation of Christianity which advocates the belief that only Celtic and Germanic peoples, such as the Anglo-Saxon, Nordic nations, or Aryan people and people of kindred blood, are the descendants of Abraham, Isaac, and Jacob and are therefore the descendants of the ancient Israelites.

Independently practiced by individuals, independent congregations, and some prison gangs, it is not an organized religion, nor is it affiliated with specific Christian denominations. Its theology is a racial interpretation of Christianity. Christian Identity beliefs were originally developed among adherents of British Israelism in the early 1900s, the developers of them were authors who regarded Europeans as the "chosen people" and regarded Jews and non-whites as the cursed offspring of Cain, who they believed was a "serpent hybrid". This aspect of Christian Identity theology is commonly called the serpent seed or two-seedline doctrine. White supremacist sects and gangs later adopted many of these teachings.

Christian Identity promotes the idea that all non-whites (people who are not of wholly European descent) will either be exterminated or enslaved in order to serve the white race in the new Heavenly Kingdom on Earth under the reign of Jesus Christ. Its doctrine states that only "Adamic" (white) people can achieve salvation and enter paradise. Many of its adherents are Millennialist.

It is considered racist, antisemitic, and white supremacist by the Anti-Defamation League and the Southern Poverty Law Center.

, estimates of the number of adherents in the United States range from two thousand to fifty thousand.

Origins

Relationship to British Israelism

The Christian Identity movement emerged in the United States in the 1920s and 1930s as an offshoot of British Israelism. While early British Israelites such as Edward Hine and John Wilson were philo-Semites, Christian Identity emerged in sharp contrast to British Israelism as a strongly antisemitic theology. The Anti-Defamation League (ADL) describes the emergence of Christian Identity from British Israelism as an 'ugly turn':

In his book Christian Identity: The Aryan American Bloodline Religion, Chester Quarles describes the emergence of Christian Identity from British Israelism as a "remarkable transition", because traditional British Israelites were advocates of philo-Semitism which paradoxically changed to anti-Semitism and racism under Christian Identity. In fact, British Israelism had several Jewish adherents, and it also received support from rabbis throughout the 19th century. Within British politics it supported Benjamin Disraeli, who was descended from Sephardi Jews. However, Christian Identity, which emerged in the 1920s, began to turn antisemitic by teaching the belief that the Jews are the descendants of Satan or Edomite-Khazars (see Khazar hypothesis of Ashkenazi ancestry) rather than the descendants of the tribe of Judah (as British Israelites maintain). The typical form of the British Israelite belief held no antisemitic views. Rather, its adherents believed that modern-day Jews were only descended from the tribes of Judah and Benjamin, while the British and other related Northern European peoples were descended from the other ten tribes.

Early years
An early book which advanced the ideas of British Israelism was Lost Israel Found in the Anglo-Saxon Race by E.P. Ingersoll, published in 1886. This was followed in the 1920s by the writings of Howard Rand (1889–1991).

Rand was a Massachusetts lawyer who obtained a law degree at the University of Maine. He was raised as a British Israelite, and his father introduced him to J. H. Allen's work Judah's Sceptre and Joseph's Birthright (1902) at an early age. Around 1924, Rand began to claim that the Jews are descended from Esau or the Canaanites rather than the tribe of Judah. He never went so far as to advocate the "serpent seed" doctrine that modern-day Jews are descendants of Satan; he only claimed that they are not the lineal descendants of Judah. Rand is considered a 'transitional' figure from British Israelism to Christian Identity, rather than its actual founder.

Rand is known for coining the term "Christian Identity". In 1933, Rand founded the Anglo-Saxon Federation of America, an organization which promoted his view that the Jews are not descended from Judah, marking the first key transition from British Israelism to Christian Identity. Beginning in May 1937, there were key meetings of British Israelites in the United States who were attracted to Rand's theory that the Jews are not descended from Judah. These meetings provided the catalyst for the eventual emergence of Christian Identity. By the late 1930s, the group's members considered Jews to be the offspring of Satan and demonized them, and they also demonized non-Caucasian races. William Dudley Pelley, the founder of the clerical fascist Silver Shirts movement, was influenced by British Israelism in the early 1930s. Links between Christian Identity and the Ku Klux Klan were also forged in the late 1930s, but by then, the KKK was past the peak of its early twentieth-century revival.

Key developers
While many key aspects of Christian Identity, like the serpent seed doctrine, existed within British Israelism as early as the 1880s, Christian Identity began to emerge as a separate movement in the 1940s, primarily over issues of racism and anti-semitism rather than over issues of Christian theology. Wesley Swift (1913–1970) is considered the father of the movement; so much so that every Anti-Defamation League publication which addresses Christian Identity mentions him. Swift was born in New Jersey, and he eventually moved to Los Angeles in order to attend Bible college. It is claimed that he may have been a "Ku Klux Klan organizer and a Klan rifle-team instructor." Swift was a minister in the Angelus Temple Foursquare Church during the 1930s and 1940s before he founded his own church in Lancaster, California and named it the Anglo-Saxon Christian Congregation, reflecting the influence of Howard Rand. In the 1950s, he was Gerald L. K. Smith's West Coast representative of the Christian Nationalist Crusade. In addition, he hosted a daily radio broadcast in California during the 1950s and 1960s, through which he was able to proclaim his ideology to a large audience. Due to Swift's efforts, the message of his church spread, leading to the founding of similar churches throughout the country.

Eventually, the name of his church was changed to the Church of Jesus Christ Christian, today this name is used by Aryan Nations. One of Swift's associates was retired Col. William Potter Gale (1917–1988). Gale became a leading figure in the anti-tax and paramilitary movements of the 1970s and 1980s, beginning with the California Rangers and the Posse Comitatus, and he also helped found the American militia movement.

The future Aryan Nations founder Richard Girnt Butler, who was an admirer of Adolf Hitler and Wisconsin Senator Joseph McCarthy, was introduced to Wesley Swift by William Potter Gale in 1962. Swift quickly converted Butler to Christian Identity. When Swift died in 1971, Butler fought against Gale, James Warner, and Swift's widow for control of the church. Butler eventually gained control of the organization and moved it from California to Hayden Lake, Idaho in 1973.

Lesser figures participated as Christian Identity theology took shape in the 1940s and 1950s, such as San Jacinto Capt, a Baptist minister and California Klansman (who claimed that he had introduced Wesley Swift to Christian Identity); and Bertrand Comparet (1901–1983), a one-time San Diego Deputy City Attorney (and a lawyer for Gerald L. K. Smith).  Later Identity figures of the 1980s include Sheldon Emry and Peter J. Peters.

The Christian Identity movement first received widespread attention from the mainstream media in 1984, when The Order, a neo-Nazi terrorist group, embarked on a murderous crime spree before it was suppressed by the FBI. Tax resister and militia movement organizer Gordon Kahl, whose death in a 1983 shootout with federal authorities helped inspire The Order, also had connections to the Christian Identity movement. The movement returned to public attention in 1992 and 1993, in the wake of the deadly Ruby Ridge confrontation, when newspapers discovered that former Green Beret and right-wing separatist Randy Weaver had a loose association with Christian Identity believers.

These groups are estimated to have two thousand members in the United States and an unknown number of members in Canada and the rest of the British Commonwealth. Due to the promotion of Christian Identity doctrines through radio and later through the Internet, an additional fifty thousand unaffiliated individuals are thought to hold Christian Identity beliefs.

Beliefs
Rather than being an organized religion, Christian Identity ("CI") is adhered to by individuals, independent congregations and some prison gangs. It is a white supremacist theology that promotes a racial interpretation of Christianity. Some Christian Identity churches preach with more violent rhetoric than others, but all of them believe that Aryans are God's chosen race rather than Jews.

Christian Identity beliefs were primarily developed and promoted by two authors who considered Europeans to be the chosen people and considered Jews to be the cursed offspring of Cain, the "serpent hybrid" (or the Serpent seed) (a belief which is known as the dual-seedline or two-seedline doctrine). Wesley Swift formulated the doctrine which states that non-Caucasian peoples have no souls and therefore they can never earn God's favor or be saved.

No single document expresses the Christian Identity belief system; there is much disagreement over the doctrines which are taught by those who ascribe to CI beliefs, since there is no central organization or headquarters for the CI sect. However, all CI adherents believe that Adam and his offspring were exclusively White and they also believe that all non-white races are pre-Adamite races because they belong to separate species, a doctrinal position which implies that they cannot be equated with or derived from the Adamites.

Christian Identity adherents assert that the white people of Europe in particular or Caucasians in general are God's servant people, according to the promises that were given to Abraham, Isaac, and Jacob. It further asserts that the early European tribes were really the Ten Lost Tribes of Israel and therefore the rightful heirs to God's promises, and God's chosen people. Colin Kidd wrote that in the United States, Christian Identity exploited "the puzzle of the Ten Lost Tribes to justify an openly anti-Semitic and virulently racist agenda." According to Michael McFarland and Glenn Gottfried, they developed their racist interpretation of Christianity because of its status as a traditional religion of the United States, which allowed them to advocate the belief that white Americans have a common identity, and because of the variety of possible interpretations of the Bible in the field of hermeneutics.

While they seek to introduce a state of racial purity in the US, Christian Identitarians do not trust the Congress or the government, allegedly controlled by Jews, to support their agenda. In their view, this means that political changes can only be made through the use of force. However, the failed experience of the terrorist group The Order has forced them to acknowledge the fact that they are currently unable to overthrow the government by staging an armed insurrection against it. Thus, the Christian Identity movement seeks an alternative to violence and government change with the creation of a "White Aryan Bastion" or a White ethnostate, such as the Northwest Territorial Imperative.

Two House theology
Like British Israelites, Christian Identity (CI) adherents believe in Two House theology, which makes a distinction between the Tribe of Judah and the Ten Lost Tribes. The primary distinction between British Israelism and CI is that unlike Christian Identitarians, British Israelites believe that the Jews are descended from the tribe of Judah. In contrast, while also maintaining a Two House distinction, Christian Identity proponents believe that the true lineal descendants of Judah are not contemporary Jews, instead, they are White Europeans whose ancestors mainly settled in Scotland, Germany, and other European nations alongside the House of Israel. In short, Christian Identity adherents believe that instead of modern-day Jews, the true descendants of the Houses of Israel and Judah are the modern-day Anglo-Saxon, Celtic, Germanic, Nordic, and kindred peoples.

Origin beliefs
Identity teaches that "Israel" was the name given to Jacob after he wrestled with the angel at Penuel as described in Genesis 32:26–32. "Israel" then had twelve sons, which began the Twelve Tribes of Israel. In 975 BC the ten northern tribes revolted, seceded from the south, and became the Kingdom of Israel.

According to Identity doctrine, 2 Esdras 13:39–46 then records the history of the nation of Israel journeying over the Caucasus mountains, along the Black Sea, to the Ar Sereth tributary of the Danube in Romania ("But they formed this plan for themselves, that they would leave the multitude of the nations and go to a more distant region, where no human beings had ever lived. ... Through that region there was a long way to go, a journey of a year and a half; and that country is called Arzareth"). The tribes prospered, and eventually colonised other European countries. Israel's leading tribe, the Tribe of Dan, is attributed with settling and naming many areas which are today distinguished by place names derived from its name – written ancient Hebrew contains no vowels, and hence "Dan" would be written as DN, but would be pronounced with an intermediate vowel dependent on the local dialect, meaning that Dan, Den, Din, Don, and Dun all have the same meaning. Various modern place names are said to derive from the name of this tribe:
 Macedonia – Macedonia – derived from Moeshe-don-ia (Moeshe being "the land of Moses")
 Danube – Dan-ube, Dniester – Dn-iester, Dnieper – Dn-ieper, Donetz – Don-etz, Danzig – Dan-zig, Don – Don

The following peoples and their analogous tribes are believed to be as follows:

 Dan – Denmark
 Gad – Italy
 Asher – Sweden
 Issachar – Finland
 Simeon – Spain
 Zebulun – France
 Naphtali – Norway
 Benjamin – Iceland
  Reuben – Netherlands
 Judah – Germany
 Ephraim – Great Britain
 Manasseh – United States

Some followers claim that the Identity genealogy of the Davidic line can be traced to the royal rulers of Britain and Queen Elizabeth II herself. Thus, Anglo-Saxons are the true Israelites, God's chosen people who were given the divine right to rule the world until the Second Coming of Christ.

Identity adherents reject the label "antisemitic" by stating that they cannot be antisemitic because the true Semites "today are the great White Christian nations of the western world", with modern Jews being considered the descendants of the Canaanites.

Adamites and pre-Adamites

A major tenet of Christian Identity is the pre-Adamite hypothesis. To support their theory on the racial identity of Adam, Christian Identity proponents point out that the Hebrew etymology of the word 'Adam' translates as 'be ruddy, red, to show blood (in the face)' often quoting from James Strong's Hebrew Dictionary and from this they conclude that only Caucasians or people with light white skin can blush or turn rosy in the face (because hemoglobin is only visible under pale skin).

A seminal influence on the Christian Identity movement's views on pre-Adamism was Charles Carroll's 1900 book The Negro a Beast or In the Image of God? In his book, Carroll sought to revive the ideas which were previously presented by Buckner H. Payne, he described the Negro as a literal ape rather than a human being. He claimed the pre-Adamite races such as blacks did not have souls and that race mixing was an insult to God because it spoiled His racial plan of creation. According to Carroll, the mixing of races had also led to the errors of atheism and evolutionism.

The idea that "lower races" are mentioned in the Bible (in contrast to Aryans) was posited in the 1905 book Theozoology; or The Science of the Sodomite Apelings and the Divine Electron by Jörg Lanz von Liebenfels, an Ariosophist and a volkisch writer who influenced Nazism.

Serpent seed

Dual Seedline Christian Identity proponents –those who believe that Eve bore children with Satan as well as with Adam – believe that Eve was seduced by the Serpent (Satan), shared her fallen state with Adam by having sex with him, and gave birth to twins with different fathers: Satan's son Cain and Adam's son Abel. This belief is referred to as the serpent seed doctrine. According to the "dual seedline" form of Christian Identity, Cain then became the progenitor of the Jews in his subsequent matings with members of the non-Adamic races.

The serpent seed idea, which ascribes the ancestry of legendary monsters such as Grendel to Cain, was widespread in the Middle Ages. It also appears in early Gnostic Christian texts as well as in some Jewish texts, for example, it appears in a 9th-century book titled Pirke De-Rabbi Eliezer. In Cain: Son of the Serpent (1985), David Max Eichhorn traces the idea back to early Jewish Midrashic texts and he also names many rabbis who taught the belief that Cain was the son of a union between the Serpent and Eve.

Some Kabbalist rabbis also believe that Cain and Abel were of a different genetic background than Seth. This teaching is based on the theory that God created two "Adams" (adam means "man" in Hebrew). To one Adam he gave a soul and to the other Adam he did not give a soul. The Adam who is without a soul is the creature who Christians call the Serpent. The Kabbalists call the serpent the Nahash (Nahash is the Hebrew word for serpent).

This event is recorded in the Zohar:

Scientific racism

Scientific racism, sometimes termed biological racism or racialism, the pseudoscientific belief that empirical evidence exists to support or justify racism, is the core tenet of Christian Identity, and most CI adherents are white nationalists who advocate racial segregation and the imposition of anti-miscegenation laws. Some CI adherents also believe that Jews are genetically compelled to carry on a conspiracy against the Adamic seedline by their Satanic or Edomite ancestry and they also believe that the Jews of today have achieved almost complete control of the Earth through their claim to hold the white race's status as God's chosen people. 

Identity adherents also assert that disease, addiction, cancer, and sexually transmitted infections (herpes and HIV/AIDS) are spread by human "rodents" via contact with "unclean" persons, such as "race-mixers". The apocrypha, particularly the first book of Enoch, is used to justify these social theories; the fallen angels of Heaven sexually desired Earth maidens and took them as wives, resulting in the birth of abominations, which God ordered Michael the Archangel to destroy, thus beginning a cosmic war between Light and Darkness. The mixing of separate things (e.g., people of different races) is seen as defiling all of them, and it is also considered a violation of God's law.

Views on homosexuality

Identity preachers proclaim that, according to the Bible, "the penalties for race-mixing, homo-sexuality, and usury are death."

Views on racial politics and economics
The first documents which advocated Christian Identity's views on racial politics and economics were written by Howard Rand and William J. Cameron after the Great Depression. In 1943, Rand published the article "Digest of the Divine Law" which discussed the political and economic challenges which existed at that time. An excerpt from the article states: "We shall not be able to continue in accord with the old order. Certain groups are already planning an economy of regimentation for our nation; but it will only intensify the suffering and want of the past and bring to our peoples all the evils that will result from such planning by a group of men who are failing to take into consideration the fundamental principles underlying the law of the Lord."

While Rand never formally named the groups which he was specifically referring to, his hatred of Jews, racial integration, and the country's economic state at that time made the direction of his comments obvious. Identifying specific economic problems was not the only goal which Rand had in mind. He began to analyze how these changes could be made to happen through legal changes; thus, making strategic plans to integrate the Bible into American law and economics. The first goal was to denounce all man-made laws and replace them with laws from the Bible. The second goal was to create an economic state which would reflect the teachings of the Bible.

While William Cameron agreed with Rand's initial argument, he specifically focused his writings on changing American economics. One of Cameron's articles, "Divine System of Taxation", spoke of the Bible supporting individualism and social justice with regard to economics. He also believed that the government had no right to tax land or other forms of property. In accordance with this doctrine, tax refunds should be applied to family vacation trips or they should be applied to national festivals which are observed by adherents of Christian Identity. Also, for the betterment of the United States' economic future, no interest should be charged on debts which are paid with credit, and no taxes should be collected during the traveling time of goods from a manufacturer to a consumer.

The mutual point which Rand and Cameron both agreed upon, was that while they may have disagreed with how the government was operating, neither of them resisted the government's current tax policies. Gordon Kahl was the first CI believer to study the founding principles of Rand and Cameron, and apply them in order to take action against the government. Kahl believed that they were on the right track with regard to what needed to be accomplished in order to change public policies. However, he felt that if no actions were taken against violators, no real changes would be made. In 1967, he stopped paying taxes because he felt he was paying "tithes to the Synagogue of Satan". Kahl killed two federal marshals in 1983. Before he was caught for the murders, Kahl wrote a note in which he said "our nation has fallen into the hands of alien people. ... These enemies of Christ have taken their Jewish Communist Manifesto and incorporated it into the Statutory Laws of our country and thrown our Constitution and our Christian Common Law into the garbage can."

Opposition to the banking system

Identity doctrine asserts that the "root of all evil" is paper money (particularly Federal Reserve Notes), and that both usury and banking systems are controlled by Jews. Exodus 22:25, Leviticus 25:35–37 and Deuteronomy explicitly condemn usury.  Ezekiel 18:13 states "He who hath given forth upon usury, and hath taken increase: shall he then live? He shall not live: he hath done all these abominations; he shall surely die; his blood shall be upon him" and it is quoted as a justification for killing Jews.

Christian Identity advocates the belief that the creation of the Federal Reserve System in 1913 shifted the control of money from Congress to private institutions and violated the Constitution and the monetary system encourages the Federal Reserve to take out loans, creating trillions of dollars in government debt, and allowing international bankers to control the United States. Credit/debit cards and computerised bills are seen as the fulfillment of the Biblical scripture which warns against "the beast" (i.e., banking) as quoted in Revelation 13:15–18.

Identity preacher Sheldon Emry stated that "Most of the owners of the largest banks in America are of Eastern European (Jewish) ancestry and connected with the (Jewish) Rothschild European banks", thus, according to Identity doctrine, the global banking conspiracy is led and controlled by Jewish interests. Emry used the radio airwaves to promote his Christian Identity message and his book Billions for the Bankers, Debts for the People.  Emry promoted abolishing the banks, which he suggested would solve most of society's ills, including unemployment, divorce, and women working outside the home.

World's end and Armageddon

Christian Identity adherents believe in the Second Coming and Armageddon. Their predictions vary, and they include a race war or a Jewish-backed United Nations takeover of the US, and they also believe that they should wage a physical struggle against individuals and groups which serve the forces of evil. While the Soviet Union has disappeared as a vital threat in their rhetoric, many Christian Identity adherents believe that Communists are secretly involved in international organizations like the United Nations, or the so-called "New World Order", in order to destroy the United States. Unlike many Protestant Fundamentalists, Christian Identity adherents reject the notion of a Rapture, based on their belief that it is a Judaized doctrine which the Bible does not teach.

Related

Organizations
 Aryan Nations
 Aryan Republican Army (ARA)
 Assembly of Christian Soldiers
 Christian Defense League
 Kingdom Identity Ministries, Harrison, Arkansas
 LaPorte Church of Christ, Fort Collins, Colorado
 The Covenant, The Sword, and the Arm of the Lord
 Church of Israel, Schell City, Missouri
 Church of Jesus Christ–Christian
 Elohim City, Oklahoma
 Phineas Priesthood
 Posse Comitatus
 The Shepherd's Chapel, a Christian Identity and King James Only movement church
 White Patriot Party

South African branches of Christian Identity have been accused of involvement in terrorist activities, including the 2002 Soweto bombings.

People
 Larry Gene Ashbrook, a mass murderer who allegedly was a self-professed Phineas Priest
 Louis Beam
 Samuel Bowers, a co-founder and the first Imperial Wizard of the White Knights of the Ku Klux Klan, believed in Christian Identity
 Richard Butler (white supremacist)
 Byron De La Beckwith, the assassin of NAACP and Civil rights movement leader Medgar Evers, became a Phineas Priest
 Randy Weaver (formerly)
 James Ellison (white supremacist)
 Bo Gritz (formerly)
 Gordon Kahl
 Chevie Kehoe
 August Kreis
 Robert E. Miles
 Thomas Robb (Ku Klux Klan)
 Eric Rudolph
 Michael W. Ryan
 Wesley A. Swift
 Dewey H "Buddy" Tucker
 Rick Tyler
 James Wickstrom
 Tom Metzger (formerly)
 Frazier Glenn Miller Jr. (formerly)

Lists
 Groups claiming affiliation with Israelites
 List of Christian denominations#Christian Identitist
 List of Christian movements#Religious
 List of neo-Nazi organizations
 List of organizations designated by the Southern Poverty Law Center as hate groups#Christian Identity
 List of white nationalist organizations

See also

 19th-century Anglo-Saxonism
 Aryanism
 Christian Patriot movement
 Fascism in North America
 Murders of Gary Matson and Winfield Mowder
 Neo-Nazism
 Nordicism
 Redemption movement
 Sovereign citizen movement

References

Further reading
 Barkun, M. (1994). Religion and the Racist Right: The Origins of the Christian Identity Movement. Chapel Hill: University of North Carolina Press. Revised edition, 1997, 
 Ingram, W.L., (1995). God and Race: British-Israelism and Christian Identity, p. 119–126 in T. Miller, Ed., America's Alternative Religions, SUNY Press, Albany NY.
 Kaplan, Jeffrey, (1997). Radical Religion in America, Syracuse, N.Y.: Syracuse University Press. pp. 47–48.
 Quarles, C. L. (2004). Christian Identity: The Aryan American Bloodline Religion. Jefferson, N.C.: McFarland.
 Roberts, Charles H. (2003). Race over Grace: The Racialist Religion of the Christian Identity Movement, Omaha, Nebraska: iUniverse Press. .

External links
 FBI backgrounder on Christian Identity

 
British Israelism
Groups claiming Israelite descent
Late modern Christian antisemitism
Nordicism
Pseudohistory
White supremacist groups in the United States